Events of 2021 in Tanzania.

Incumbents 

 President
John Magufuli, died March 17
Samia Suluhu, starting March 17
 Vice-President: 
Samia Suluhu, until March 17
 Vice-President: Philip Mpango
 Prime Minister: Kassim Majaliwa
 Chief Justice: Ibrahim Hamis Juma

Events
Ongoing – COVID-19 pandemic in Tanzania

January to March
16 January – The French Embassy announces it is working with the Association of the Tanzanian Diaspora Living in France to promote the Kiswahili language.
19 January – The United States puts visa restrictions on unnamed Tanzanian officials because of responsibility or complicity in irregularities and violence in the 2020 Tanzanian general election.
25 January – A man is arrested in Austria trying to smuggle seventy-four protected chameleons from Tanzania. Three died, but the rest were taken to the Schönbrunn Zoo.
27 January – President John Magufuli expresses doubts about the COVID-19 vaccines on January 27 during a speech in Chato, Geita Region.
23 February – Maskless Finance Minister Philip Mpango coughs his way through a press conference to announce he is not dead a few days after President Magufuli acknowledged COVID-19 in real.
10 March – Opposition leader Tundu Lissu demands answers about the health and whereabouts of President John Magufuli, 61, who has not been seen in public since 27 February.
15 March – Four people are arrested for spreading rumors that President Magufuli is ill, despite his not being seen in public in four weeks.
17 March - President John Magufuli dies; Vice-President Samia Suluhu takes over.
21 March - 45 people are killed in a stampede at Uhuru Stadium in Dar es Salaam.
28 March – President Samia Suluhu Hassan orders the suspension of the head of the ports authority over corruption allegations.
30 March – President Hassan picks Philip Mpango, the finance minister, to be her deputy.

 25 August – A gunman shoots dead three police officers and a security guard in Dar es Salaam.

Culture

Deaths
17 January – Ilunga 'CPwaa' Khalifa, 38, rapper; pneumonia.
20 January – Julius Sang′udi, deputy commissioner of prisons.
21 January – Martha Umbulla, 65, politician.
21 January – Prudence Karugendo, writer and political analyst.
22 January – Emanuel Maganga, former Kigoma Region commissioner.
23 January – Ireneus Kaganda Mbahulira, 78, bishop.
25 January – Gregory Teu, 69, former deputy minister.
12 February – Atashasta Justus Nditiye, 51, former deputy minister; complications after traffic accident.
12 February – Harith Bakari Mwapachu, 81, former minister.
13 February – Regina Rweyemamu, former High Court judge.
15 February – Muhammed Seif Khatib, 70, former minister and owner of Zenji FM.
17 February – Seif Sharif Hamad, 77, First Vice President of Zanzibar and ACT chairman; COVID-19.
17 February – John Kijazi, 64, chief secretary to the President, chancellor of University of Dodoma; heart attack.
20 February – Servacius Likwelile, 63, former Permanent Secretary in the Ministry of Finance.
22 February – Benno Ndulu, 71, former governor of the Bank of Tanzania.
25 February – Arthur Shoo, Secretary-General, Northern Diocese, Evangelical Lutheran Church in Tanzania.
17 March – John Magufuli, 61, President; heart complications.
6 April – Alfred Maluma, 65, Catholic bishop of Njombe; traffic accident.
28 April – Moses Beatus Mlula, defence adviser at the High Commission of Tanzania in New Delhi; COVID-19.
18 May – Tumainiel Kiwelu, 79, former commander and chief of staff in the Tanzania People's Defence Force during the Uganda–Tanzania War.
29 June – Patrick Mfugale, 70 or 71, CEO of Tanzania Roads Agency.
22 July – Anna Mghwira, 62, former regional commissioner of Kilimanjaro Region.
30 July – Ambilikile Mwasapile, also known as Babu wa Loliondo, former Lutheran priest turned discoverer of miracle potion.
2 August – Elias John Kwandikwa, 55, Minister for Defence and National Service.
17 August – Basil Mramba, 81, former finance minister; COVID-19.
27 September – William Olenasha, 49, politician.
18 November – ‘Nick’ Al Noor Kassum Sunderji, 97, former politician and university chancellor.
18 December – ‘Baharia’ Issa, 64, politician.

See also

2021–22 South-West Indian Ocean cyclone season
COVID-19 pandemic in Africa
Common Market for Eastern and Southern Africa
East African Community
International Conference on the Great Lakes Region

References

External links
 

 
Tanzania
Tanzania